Conasprella coromandelicus is a species of sea snail, a marine gastropod mollusk in the family Conidae, the cone snails and their allies.

This species was originally described as Conus coromandelicus E. A. Smith, 1894.

Description
The size of an adult shell varies between 29 mm and 45 mm.

Distribution
Conasprella coromandelicus is a demersal sea snail, found in the Indian Ocean: East Africa, Bay of Bengal, Sri Lanka and Gulf of Oman. It is found in waters ranging from 70–400 meters in depth.

References

 Melvill, J. Cosmo. "CONUS COROMANDELICUS, SMITH, ITS PROBABLE AFFINITIES, AND SYSTEMATIC POSITION IN THE FAMILY CONIDÆ." Journal of Molluscan Studies 6.3 (1904): 170–173.
 Filmer R.M. (2001). A Catalogue of Nomenclature and Taxonomy in the Living Conidae 1758 - 1998. Backhuys Publishers, Leiden. 388pp.
 Tucker J.K. (2009). Recent cone species database. 4 September 2009 Edition
 Tucker J.K. & Stahlschmidt P. (2010) A second species of Pseudoconorbis (Gastropoda: Conoidea) from India. Miscellanea Malacologica 4(3): 31–34
  Puillandre N., Duda T.F., Meyer C., Olivera B.M. & Bouchet P. (2015). One, four or 100 genera? A new classification of the cone snails. Journal of Molluscan Studies. 81: 1–23

External links
  Proceedings of the Malacological Society of London vol. 6 (1904–1905), p. 170–172
 
Cone Shells – Knights of the Sea

coromandelica
Gastropods described in 1894